Brian Graham (born April 9, 1960 in San Diego, California) is a former minor league baseball player, coach and manager and major league coach for the Cleveland Indians. He is the former director of player development for the Baltimore Orioles. He is currently employed as the director of the Appalachian league.

College
Graham attended the University of California, Los Angeles where he played both baseball and football. When he finished his collegiate career, Graham held school records for hits, stolen bases, and runs. In football, Graham was a member of the 1978 Fiesta Bowl team. In 1996, he was inducted into the school's Baseball Hall of Fame. Brian received a bachelor's in behavioral sciences from National University in 1987.

Minor league career
In 1982, Graham was chosen in the fourth round of the 1982 draft by the Oakland Athletics, and he played in the
minor league systems of Oakland, the Milwaukee Brewers, the Detroit Tigers, and the Cleveland Indians over the next five years as a second baseman.

Coaching/managing
In nine seasons as a minor league manager in the Cleveland Indians organization, Graham's teams finished above .500 each year, compiling a 704-491 (.589) record. Graham managed eight consecutive playoff teams. He was named the Carolina League's Manager of the Year in 1991 while leading the Kinston Indians to a championship, the “Best Managerial Prospect” by Eastern League managers and Baseball America in 1993 and Minor League Manager of the Year by USA Today's Baseball Weekly in 1996 while with the Buffalo Bisons (winning a championship in 1997). Graham has also managed in the Dominican Republic Winter League for Aguilas (1991) and has also coached and managed in the Arizona Fall League (1993–94).

Graham was a major league coach with the Cleveland Indians in 1998 and 1999 and with the Baltimore Orioles in 2000. Graham spent the 2001 season as the Field Coordinator for the Florida Marlins.

Major league executive
Graham was signed to the Pirates on December 3, 2001 and eventually rose to be the senior director for player development. In that position, he coordinated instruction and oversaw the signing of free agents, staffing, budgets, player movement, affiliate relationships and the Latin American field operations. In addition, he installed and implemented a system of individual player plans which provided instruction and resources to insure the individual development of every Pirate player. Under Graham, the Pirates minor league teams finished with a combined winning percentage above .500 in four of his five seasons. In 2002, the Pirates were honored as the Topps' Baseball “Organization of the Year.”

On September 7, 2007, he was appointed interim General Manager of the Pirates after the dismissal of Dave Littlefield. On October 5, 2007, he was fired along with manager Jim Tracy, scouting director Ed Creech, and director of baseball operations Jon Mercurio.

Graham was named the special assignment coach for the minor leagues for the Baltimore Orioles on October 30, 2007.  Graham was named Director of Player Development for the Baltimore Orioles in 2013.

In early October 2018, Graham was named as the Interim General Manager in the wake of the firings of Dan Duquette and Buck Showalter. On November 30, permanent General Manager Mike Elias informed Graham that he would not be retained for the 2019 season.

Personal life
Brian Graham resides in Cranberry Township, Pennsylvania, with his wife Karen and three
children, Jack, Kelsey, and Kendall.

References

External links
Official Bio
Article

1960 births
Living people
Baseball players from California
Medford A's players
Madison Muskies players
Modesto A's players
Albany-Colonie A's players
Huntsville Stars players
Glens Falls Tigers players
Waterbury Indians players
El Paso Diablos players
Minor league baseball managers
Buffalo Bisons (minor league) managers
Major League Baseball general managers
Major League Baseball executives
Pittsburgh Pirates executives
Cleveland Indians coaches
Baltimore Orioles coaches